This page describes the qualifying rounds for the Turkish Airlines Euroleague 2010–11.

The qualifying rounds consisted of three rounds, played in home and away series.

Teams

Notes

Draw
The draw was made on Thursday, July 8, 2010 at Barcelona, Spain. The draw began at 11:15 local time (CET) and determined the qualifying-round matchups and regular-season groups for the Euroleague, as well as the qualifying rounds for the Eurocup and the regular-season for the EuroChallenge.

Teams were organised into four pots of four teams. Teams of pot 1 faced teams of pot 4, while teams from pots 2 and 3 faced each other. 

Bracket

The higher ranked team hosted the second leg.

First qualifying round
The first qualifying round had 16 teams playing in two-game series (home and away), the winners advanced to the second qualifying round. The losers of these two-game series will play in the 2010–11 Eurocup Regular Season.

First leg

Second leg

Second qualifying round
The eight winners of the first qualifying round entered the second round. The first leg was played on September 28 and the second leg at 1 October 2010.

First leg

Second leg

Third qualifying round
The four winners of the second qualifying round entered the last qualifying round to determine the participants of the regular season.

First leg

Second leg

References

Qualifying rounds